Mustafa Arslanović (born February 24, 1960) is a retired Bosnian footballer. A defender, he played for SFR Yugoslavia.

International career
Arslanović earned his first and only international cap on 25 March 1987 with SFR Yugoslavia in a winning game against Austria.

References

External links

Profile at Serbian federation site

1960 births
Living people
People from Novi Grad, Bosnia and Herzegovina
Association football defenders
Yugoslav footballers
Yugoslavia international footballers
Bosnia and Herzegovina footballers
GNK Dinamo Zagreb players
NK Zagreb players
Ascoli Calcio 1898 F.C. players
Hallescher FC players
Bonner SC players
Yugoslav First League players
Serie A players
Serie B players
2. Bundesliga players
Oberliga (football) players
Yugoslav expatriate footballers
Expatriate footballers in Italy
Yugoslav expatriate sportspeople in Italy
Bosnia and Herzegovina expatriate footballers
Expatriate footballers in Germany
Yugoslav expatriate sportspeople in Germany
Bosnia and Herzegovina expatriate sportspeople in Germany